Rhea (formerly Rhea Mill and Rhea's Mill; pronounced  ) is an unincorporated community in Rhea's Mill Township, Washington County, Arkansas, United States. It is located on a county road north of Lincoln and Lincoln Lake. Weddington Mountain is just to the west.

History
Variant names were "Rhea Mills" and "Rheas Mills". A post office called Rheas Mills was established in 1867, the name was changed to Rhea Mills in 1893, the name was again changed to Rhea in 1894, and the post office closed in 1963. The community has the name of William H. Rhea, an early postmaster.

References

Unincorporated communities in Washington County, Arkansas
Unincorporated communities in Arkansas